The Great House is a children's historical novel by Cynthia Harnett. It was first published in 1949 with illustrations by the author.

The novel is set in 1690 and concerns the building of a grand house in the new style, contrasted with the older manor house, which still reflects its medieval origins. The architectural differences are representative of the social changes of the period.

1949 British novels
1949 children's books
Children's historical novels
British children's novels
British historical novels
Novels set in the 1690s
Novels set in Early Modern England
Novels about architects
Methuen Publishing books
Fiction set in 1690